Peter Schreck (born 1942) is an Australian writer, best known for his work in television.

Select Credits
Because He's My Friend (1978) - TV movie
We of the Never Never (1982) - film
The Coolangatta Gold (1984) - film
Police Rescue (1991) - film
Wildside (1999) - TV series
Young Lions (2002) - TV series

External links

Peter Schreck at AustLit

Australian writers
1942 births
Living people